The death of Sha-Asia Washington occurred on July 3, 2020 at the Woodhull Medical Center while she was in childbirth. Her death sparked protests and raised awareness about Black maternal mortality in the United States.

Death 
Sha-Asia Washington was a paraprofessional at a charter school in Brooklyn. She went to Woodhull Medical Center on July 2, 2020 for a routine stress test. Washington was a few days past her due date and her blood pressure was high. The hospital administered Pitocin to induce uterine contractions. Anesthesiologist Dmitry Anatolevich Shelchkov improperly administered an epidural. Washington went into cardiac arrest at which point, the doctors performed an emergency Caesarean section. After 45 minutes of cardiopulmonary resuscitation, Washington was pronounced dead.

Shelchkov lost his medical license in late 2021.

Reactions 
Washington's death sparked protests at the medical center and brought attention to the wider issue of Black maternal mortality in the United States.

New York state senators Julia Salazar and Gustavo Rivera co-sponsored bill S8729 the would require hospitals to release statistics related to childbirth complications, fetal loss, and maternity related injuries.

In the fall of 2020, mural artist Danielle Mastrion painted a mural of Washington on Lewis Avenue in Bedford–Stuyvesant, Brooklyn. A memorial garden for Washington was established in Bedford-Stuyvesant.

See also 

 Death of Chaniece Wallace
 Medical racism in the United States

References 

Deaths in childbirth
July 2020 events in the United States
2020 deaths
African-American history in New York City
Deaths by person in New York City
Accidental deaths in New York (state)
Events in Brooklyn, New York